Gertrud is a Swedish 1906 play (drama), in three parts, by author and playwright Hjalmar Söderberg.

Story description
The play is a modern relationship drama. The main characters are the middle-aged Gertrud and three men she has a relationship with: her husband Gustav Kanning, a politician; her former lover Gabriel Lidman, an older poet; and her newfound love Erland Jansson, a young composer. All three desire her and have desired her in a different way.

The first act is set in Gustaf Kanning's study at his home, where Gertrud, in the first scene, sits in the dark awaiting her husband's return from work. She is going to tell she is leaving him for her newfound love, and her former love interest suddenly returns from a long trip overseas. Gertrud is faced with questions about the sacrifice she is making for Jansson, and the reactions of Kanning and Lidman.

The play tackles themes of love, passion, the feeling of being trapped and confined in a marriage, the need of love, the search of the love, the ontology of real love, the right to love and be loved, love and closeness in a relationship, and differences between men and women.

The original production in Sweden premiered on February 13, 1907, at the old Royal Dramatic Theatre featuring Gerda Lundequist in the title role.

Characters
Gertrud Kanning
Gustav Kanning
Gabriel Lidman
Erland Jansson
Kanning's mother
The White Shape

Notable productions
The original 1907 staging with Gerda Lundequist as Gertrud by the Royal Dramatic Theatre.
The 1953 Dramaten-staging with Eva Dahlbeck as Gertrud.
The 1999 TV-theatre adaption (SVT) with Marie Richardson as Gertrud.

Film adaptation
1964 – Gertrud (directed by Carl Theodor Dreyer)

External links
 Gertrud: notes of production at Målarsalen, the Royal Dramatic Theatre’s small stage, 2014, Dramaten.se: John Caird (director)

Sources
 Schamus, James, 2008: Carl Theodor Dreyer's Gertrud: The Moving Word. University of Washington Press 

1906 plays
Swedish plays
Plays set in Sweden
Plays set in the 1900s
Works by Hjalmar Söderberg
Swedish plays adapted into films